

Belgium
 Congo Free State – Théophile Wahis, Governor-General of the Congo Free State (1892–1908)

France
 French Somaliland – Léonce Lagarde, Governor of French Somaliland (1888–1899)
 Guinea – Noël-Eugène Ballay, Lieutenant-Governor of Guinea (1893–1895)

Portugal
 Angola – Álvaro Ferreira, Governor-General of Angola (1893–1896)

United Kingdom
 Bermuda -
 Gold Coast -
 India -
 Lagos Colony -
 Malta Colony – Arthur Fremantle, Governor of Malta (1893–1899)
 Colony of Natal – Sir Walter Hely-Hutchinson (1893–1901)
 New South Wales – Sir Robert Duff, Governor of New South Wales (1893–1895)
 Queensland – Field Marshal Sir Henry Norman, Governor of Queensland (1889–1895)
 Tasmania – Jenico Preston, Lord Gormanston, Governor of Tasmania (1893–1900)
 South Australia – Algernon Keith-Falconer, Lord Kintore, Governor of South Australia (1889–1895)
 Victoria – John Hope, Earl of Hopetoun, Governor of Victoria (1889–1895)
 Western Australia – Sir William Robinson, Governor of Western Australia (1890–1895)

Colonial governors
Colonial governors
1894